The 2007 San Francisco 49ers season was the franchise's 62nd season, and 58th in the National Football League.  They ended their season with a disappointing record of 5–11 in 2007, failing to improve upon their 7–9 record from 2006.  The 49ers offense struggled all season long as offensive coordinator Jim Hostler was subject to much scrutiny and criticism regarding his playcalling and starting quarterback Alex Smith injured his shoulder early in the season. This season is also noted for being Bryant Young's last season, the last remaining member of the Super Bowl XXIX team.

Staff

Offseason

Free agency
The 49ers addressed their problems in the secondary with the signing of veteran cornerback Nate Clements from the Buffalo Bills. The contract was worth $80 million for 8 years, the largest contract given to a defensive player in NFL history. They also signed strong safety Michael Lewis from Philadelphia on the same day. Other key defensive pickups included linebackers Colby Bockwoldt and Tully Banta-Cain and nosetackle Aubrayo Franklin. The team also addressed its wide-receiver needs by signing former Denver Bronco and Atlanta Falcon, Ashley Lelie and Seattle Seahawk, Darrell Jackson.
San Francisco also used the free agency period to extend Gore's contract to 4 years worth $28 million, $14 million of which is guaranteed.

Draft
In the 2007 NFL draft, they addressed their need for an inside linebacker by picking Patrick Willis in the first round and also gave up their 2008 first round pick to the New England Patriots and selected 28 overall Offensive Tackle Joe Staley. In the 2nd round the 49ers traded their pick for the Colts' number one pick in the 2008 NFL Draft. On the second day of the NFL Draft, the San Francisco 49ers traded a 4th round pick for Seattle Seahawks leading receiver, Darrell Jackson.

Roster

Preseason

Schedule

Regular season

Schedule

Standings

Regular season

Week 1: vs. Arizona Cardinals

Dressed up in their throwback uniforms, the 49ers began their 2007 campaign against their NFC West rival, the Arizona Cardinals in the second game of the Monday Night Football doubleheader. In the first quarter, the Niners drew first blood as RB Frank Gore got a 6-yard TD run for the score of the period.  However, in the second quarter, the Cardinals took the lead with kicker with Neil Rackers getting a 35-yard field goal and RB Edgerrin James getting a 7-yard TD run. San Francisco ended the half with kicker Joe Nedney getting a 33-yard field goal.

In the third quarter, the 49ers retook the lead with Nedney kicking a 30-yard field goal for the only score of the period. In the fourth quarter, Arizona jumped ahead with QB Matt Leinart completing a 5-yard TD pass to WR Anquan Boldin. With time running out late in the game, QB Alex Smith led the Niners on a last-minute drive that included a 20-yard run by Alex Smith and ended with WR Arnaz Battle getting a 1-yard TD run. The Cardinals had just enough time to try a late-game comeback, but San Francisco clinched the game with CB Shawntae Spencer getting an interception for the win. Matt Leinart's first and last passes in the game were both interceptions.

With the win, not only did the 49ers begin their year at 1–0, but Mike Nolan finally got his first win against Arizona as a head coach.

Scoring summary

Q1 – SF – 11:24 – Frank Gore 6-yard TD run (Joe Nedney kick) (SF 7–0)

Q2 – ARI – 12:55 – Neil Rackers 35-yard FG (SF 7–3)

Q2 – ARI – 9:15 – Edgerrin James 7-yard TD run (Rackers kick) (ARI 10–7)

Q2 – SF – 3:40 – Joe Nedney 33-yard FG (10–10)

Q3 – SF – 11:20 – Joe Nedney 30-yard FG (SF 13–10)

Q4 – ARI – 6:46 – 5-yard TD pass from Matt Leinart to Anquan Boldin (Rackers kick) (ARI 17–13)

Q4 – SF – 0:26 – Arnaz Battle 1-yard TD run (Nedney kick) (SF 20–17)

Week 2: at St. Louis Rams

Coming off their divisional home win over the Cardinals, the 49ers flew to the Edward Jones Dome for a Week 2 divisional duel against their NFC West rival, the St. Louis Rams.

In the first quarter, the Niners trailed early as Rams QB Marc Bulger completed a 12-yard TD pass to WR Torry Holt for the only score of the period.  In the second quarter, San Francisco tied the game with RB Frank Gore getting a 1-yard TD run.  St. Louis took the halftime lead on a Jeff Wilkins 29-yard field goal.

In the third quarter, the 49ers took the lead with Gore breaking through a gang of tacklers for a 43-yard TD run, along with the only score of the period.  In the fourth quarter, the Rams retook the lead with Wiklins getting a 53-yard field goal.  Because a St. Louis goof-up on special teams, the Niners took the lead with kicker Joe Nedney getting a 40-yard field goal.  Near the end the game, the Rams had one last chance to win the game, but Wilkins' 56-yard field goal attempt fell about a yard short of the crossbar.

With the win, the 49ers improved to 2–0 for the first time since 1998.

Scoring summary

Q1 – STL – 6:04 – 12-yard TD pass from Marc Bulger to Torry Holt (Wilkins kick) (STL 7–0)

Q2 – SF – 14:57 – Frank Gore 1-yard TD run (Nedney kick) (7–7)

Q2 – STL – 9:04 – Jeff Wilkins 27-yard FG (STL 10–7)

Q2 – STL – 1:51 – Jeff Wilkins 29-yard FG (STL 13–7)

Q3 – SF – 2:43 – Frank Gore 43-yard TD run (Nedney kick) (SF 14–13)

Q4 – STL – 10:04 – Jeff Wilkins 53-yard FG (STL 16–14)

Q4 – SF – 3:23 – Joe Nedney 40-yard FG (SF 17–16)

Week 3: at Pittsburgh Steelers

Game summary

Coming off a fierce divisional road win over the Rams, the 49ers flew to Heinz Field for an interconference duel with the Pittsburgh Steelers.  In the first quarter, the Niners struck first with kicker Joe Nedney getting a 32-yard field goal.  The Steelers immediately responded with CB–RS Allen Rossum returning a kickoff 98 yards for a touchdown.  San Francisco wrapped up the period with Nedney kicking a 22-yard field goal.  In the second quarter, Pittsburgh increased its lead with QB Ben Roethlisberger completing a 9-yard TD pass to TE Jerame Tuman for the only score of the period.

In the third quarter, the Steelers increased its lead with kicker Jeff Reed nailing a 36-yard field goal.  The Niners replied with Nedney kicking a 49-yard field goal.  In the fourth quarter, Pittsburgh took control with Reed getting a 49-yard and a 35-yard field goal, while CB Bryant McFadden returned an interception 50 yards for a touchdown.  San Francisco got a touchdown as QB Alex Smith completed a 21-yard pass to WR Taylor Jacobs.  Afterwards, the Steelers ended the game with RB Najeh Davenport getting a 39-yard TD run.

With the loss, the 49ers fell to 2–1.

Scoring summary

Q1 – SF – 9:24 – Joe Nedney 32-yard FG (SF 3–0)

Q1 – PIT – 9:12 – Allen Rossum 98-yard kickoff return (PIT 7–3)

Q1 – SF – 3:01 – Joe Nedney 22-yard FG (PIT 7–6)

Q2 – PIT – 0:37 – Jerame Tuman 9-yard pass from Ben Roethlisberger (Jeff Reed kick) (PIT 14–6)

Q3 – PIT – 9:41 – Jeff Reed 36-yard FG (PIT 17–6)

Q3 – SF – 4:46 – Joe Nedney 49-yard FG (PIT 17–9)

Q4 – PIT – 14:55 – Jeff Reed 49-yard FG (PIT 20–9)

Q4 – PIT – 4:59 – Jeff Reed 35-yard FG (PIT 23–9)

Q4 – PIT – 4:01 – Bryant McFadden 50-yard interception return (Reed kick) (PIT 30–9)

Q4 – SF – 2:22 – Taylor Jacobs 21-yard pass from Alex Smith (Nedney kick) (PIT 30–16)

Q4 – PIT – 1:51 – Najeh Davenport 39-yard run (Nedney kick) (PIT 37–16)

Week 4: vs. Seattle Seahawks

Hoping to rebound from their road loss to the Steelers, the 49ers went home and played an NFC West battle with the Seattle Seahawks. In the first quarter, the Niners lost QB Alex Smith with a separated shoulder during a sack.  Back-up QB Trent Dilfer took over for the rest of the game. In the second quarter, San Francisco's recent woes continued with Seahawks kicker Josh Brown getting a 23-yard field goal. Afterwards, Seattle began to pound away with QB Matt Hasselbeck completing a 17-yard TD pass to WR Bobby Engram, along with Brown kicking a 31-yard field goal.

In the third quarter, the Seahawks continued their domination as Hasselbeck completed a 14-yard TD pass to TE Marcus Pollard. The Niners got their only score of the game as kicker Joe Nedney got a 43-yard field goal. In the fourth quarter, Seattle sealed San Francisco's doom with Brown nailing a 25-yard field goal.

With their second-straight loss, the 49ers fell to 2–2.

Week 5: vs. Baltimore Ravens

Trying to break a two-game skid, the 49ers stayed at home for a Week 5 interconference matchup with the Baltimore Ravens.  With QB Alex Smith out with a shoulder injury, back-up Trent Dilfer was given the start against the team to which he helped deliver a Super Bowl title.

After a scoreless first quarter, the Ravens got the lead with kicker Matt Stover getting a 26-yard and a 32-yard field goal. In the third quarter, Baltimore increased its lead with Stover nailing a 49-yard field goal. The Niners came close to taking the lead with Dilfer completing a 49-yard TD pass to WR Arnaz Battle. With two minutes left in the fourth quarter, the 49ers had a chance to take the lead, but kicker Joe Nedney missed a 52-yard field goal and the Ravens ran out the clock.

With their third straight loss, the 49ers entered their bye week at 2–3.

Week 7: at New York Giants

Trying to snap a three-game losing streak, the 49ers flew to Giants Stadium for a Week 7 brawl with the New York Giants.  With QB Alex Smith still recovering from a shoulder injury, back-up Trent Dilfer once again got the start.  In the first quarter, the Niners trailed early as Giants QB Eli Manning hooked up with WR Amani Toomer on a 4-yard TD pass (with a missed PAT) for the only score of the period.  In the second quarter, San Francisco took the lead with Dilfer completing a 17-yard TD pass to WR Arnaz Battle.  However, New York responded with RB Brandon Jacobs getting a 5-yard TD run, while kicker Lawrence Tynes nailed field goals of 29 and 39 yards.

In the third quarter, things got worse for the Niners as Giants DE Osi Umenyiora sacked Dilfer, causing a fumble, picked up the loose ball, and ran 75 yards for a touchdown.  San Francisco managed to get a safety as FB Moran Norris blocked a punt, which went out of bounds in the end zone.  In the fourth quarter, New York sealed its win with Manning completing a 2-yard TD pass to TE Jeremy Shockey.  The Niners ended its day with Dilfer completing a 1-yard TD pass to WR Darrell Jackson (with a failed 2-point conversion).

With its fourth-straight loss, the 49ers fell to 2–4.

Week 8: vs. New Orleans Saints

Trying to snap a four-game skid, the 49ers went home for a Week 8 intraconference duel with the New Orleans Saints. QB Alex Smith (who was recovering from a separate right shoulder since Week 4) was healthy enough to get the start.

In the first quarter, San Francisco trailed early as Saints QB Drew Brees completed a 17-yard TD pass to WR Marques Colston, while kicker Olindo Mare nailed a 26-yard field goal. In the second quarter, the Niners' struggles continued as Brees completed a 2-yard TD pass to WR Terrance Copper, along with completing a 3-yard TD pass to Colston. In the third quarter, San Francisco managed to get on the board with kicker Joe Nedney getting a 29-yard field goal for the only score of the period. In the fourth quarter, New Orleans wrapped up the win with Brees and Colston hooking up with each other again on a 15-yard TD pass. The Niners' only response was Smith completing a 7-yard TD pass to TE Vernon Davis.

With their fifth-straight loss, the 49ers dropped to 2–5.

Week 9: at Atlanta Falcons

Trying to break a five-game losing skid, the 49ers flew to the Georgia Dome for a Week 9 intraconference duel with the Atlanta Falcons. In the first quarter, the Niners struck first as RB Maurice Hicks got a 9-yard TD run. However, the Falcons answered with RB Warrick Dunn getting a 9-yard TD run.  In the second quarter, San Francisco fell behind as Atlanta RB Ovie Mughelli got a 1-yard TD run for the only score of the period.

In the third quarter, the 49ers crept close as kicker Joe Nedney got a 49-yard and a 32-yard field goal. However, in the fourth quarter, the Falcons replied with kicker Morten Andersen getting a 33-yard field goal. Nedney and the Niners tried to close the gap as Nedney kicked a 22-yard field goal. Andersen's 27-yard field goal helped seal Atlanta's win.

With their sixth-straight loss, the 49ers dropped to 2–6.

Week 10: at Seattle Seahawks

Trying to snap their six-game losing streak, the 49ers flew to Qwest Field for an NFC West rematch on Monday Night Football with the Seattle Seahawks. In the first quarter, the Niners trailed early as Seahawks QB Matt Hasselbeck completed a 1-yard TD pass to TE Will Heller, along with kicker Josh Brown. In the second quarter, San Francisco's struggles continued as RB Maurice Morris gave Seattle a 6-yard TD run for the only score of the period. After a scoreless third quarter, the Seahawks sealed the win and the season-sweep with Hasselbeck completing a 10-yard TD pass to WR D.J. Hackett.

With their seventh-straight loss, the 49ers fell to 2–7.

Week 11: vs. St. Louis Rams

Trying to break their seven-game losing skid, the 49ers went home, donned their throwback uniforms, and played their Week 11 NFC West rematch with the St. Louis Rams. In the first quarter, the Niners' struggles continued as Rams QB Marc Bulger completed a 3-yard touchdown reception to WR Torry Holt. San Francisco managed to respond with kicker Joe Nedney 28-yard field goal.  In the second quarter, St. Louis increased its lead with kicker Jeff Wilkins getting a 49-yard field goal for the only score of the period.

After a scoreless third quarter, the Rams sealed the win with Wilkins kicking a 35-yard field goal. The Niners tried to mount a comeback as Nedney nailed a 38-yard and a 46-yard field goal. However, on four-straight plays deep in St. Louis territory, four shots to the endzone resulted in 3 incompletions and an interception.

With their eighth-straight loss, the 49ers dropped to 2–8.

Week 12: at Arizona Cardinals

Trying to snap an eight-game losing streak, the 49ers flew to the University of Phoenix Stadium for a Week 12 NFC West rematch with the Arizona Cardinals. In the first quarter, the Niners trailed early as Cardinals QB Kurt Warner completed a 28-yard TD pass to WR Larry Fitzgerald. San Francisco responded with QB Trent Dilfer completed a 2-yard TD pass to TE Vernon Davis. In the second quarter, the 49ers took the lead with kicker Joe Nedney getting a 19-yard field goal & RB Frank Gore getting an 11-yard TD run.  However, Arizona regained the lead with RB Marcel Shipp getting a 1-yard TD run & Warner hooking up with Fitzgerald again on a 48-yard TD pass.

In the third quarter, the Niners retook the lead as Dilfer completed a 57-yard TD pass to WR Arnaz Battle for the only score of the period. In the fourth quarter, it was back-and-forth as Cardinals QB Tim Rattay (a former 49er) completed a 2-yard TD pass to TE Ben Patrick, while Gore managed to get a 35-yard TD run. Afterwards, Arizona ended regulation with kicker Neil Rackers getting a 19-yard TD field goal. In overtime, the ball went back and forth between the Cardinals and the 49ers. When the Cardinals had the ball, Kurt Warner threw the ball to WR Sean Morey who appeared to have a sure touchdown, but was run down by 49ers rookie linebacker Patrick Willis. Kicker Neil Rackers missed a field goal, and the 49ers got the ball back. After a three and out, punter Andy Lee pinned the Cardinals close to their own endzone. San Francisco lifted their demons with stripping Warner in his endzone and LB Tully Banta-Cain landed on it for the touchdown and the win.

With the win, not only did the 49ers improve to 3–8, it also snapped their dreaded eight-game losing streak. It also gave them a season-sweep over the Cardinals. It also improved their overtime record under head coach Mike Nolan to 3–0. With the victory, the 49ers improved to 2–0 against the Cardinals and 1–8 against everyone else this season.

Week 13: at Carolina Panthers

Coming off an impressive divisional road win over the Cardinals, the 49ers flew to Bank of America Stadium for a Week 13 intraconference game with the Carolina Panthers. In the first quarter, the Niners trailed early as Panthers kicker John Kasay nailing a 19-yard field goal for the only score of the period. In the second quarter, San Francisco continued to struggle as Carolina QB Vinny Testaverde completed a 5-yard to TE Dante Rosario, along with CB Richard Marshall returning an interception 67 yards for a touchdown.

In the third quarter, the Niners managed to get on the board with QB Trent Dilfer completing a 20-yard TD pass to WR Arnaz Battle and 21-yard TD pass to TE Delanie Walker. Afterwards, the Panthers replied with RB DeShaun Foster getting a 1-yard TD run.  In the fourth quarter, Carolina sealed the win with Testaverde completing a 1-yard TD pass to TE Jeff King.

With the loss, not only did the 49ers drop to 3–9, it guaranteed them their fifth consecutive losing season since San Francisco's last playoff appearance in 2002.

Week 14: vs. Minnesota Vikings

Hoping to rebound from their road loss to the Panthers, the 49ers went home for a Week 14 duel with the Minnesota Vikings. In the first quarter, the Niners trailed early as Vikings DT Kevin Williams returned an interception 18 yards for a touchdown, while kicker Ryan Longwell managed to get a 48-yard field goal. In the second quarter, Minnesota sealed the win early as QB Tarvaris Jackson completed a 19-yard TD pass to WR Robert Ferguson, Longwell nailing a 46-yard field goal, and RB Chester Taylor getting an 84-yard TD run. In the third quarter, San Francisco got their only score of the game as QB Shaun Hill completed a 5-yard TD pass to WR Arnaz Battle.

With the loss, the 49ers fell to 3–10. The only positive from the game was that the Niners held rookie RB phenom Adrian Peterson to just 3 rushing yards on 14 carries.

Starting QB Trent Dilfer (7/19 for 45 yards and 1 interception) left the game in the second quarter with a head injury.

Week 15: vs. Cincinnati Bengals

Trying to snap a two-game skid, the 49ers stayed at home for a Saturday night interconference battle with the Cincinnati Bengals.  With QB Trent Dilfer out with an injury, back-up Shaun Hill made his first career start.

After a scoreless first quarter, the Niners drew first blood in the second quarter as Hill got a 3-yard TD run.  However, the Bengals took the lead as kicker Shayne Graham made a 24-yard field goal, while QB Carson Palmer completed a 52-yard TD pass to WR Chris Henry.  The Niners ended the half as Hill completed a 17-yard TD pass to TE Vernon Davis.

In the third quarter, San Francisco increased their lead with kicker Joe Nedney managing to get a 29-yard and a 38-yard  field goal.  In the fourth quarter, Cincinnati tried to mount a comeback as Graham kicked a 35-yard field goal.  The Niners' defense held on for the victory.

With the win, the 49ers improved to 4–10.  With the Rams' loss to the Packers, the Niners now sit in 3rd place in the NFC West.

Week 16: vs. Tampa Bay Buccaneers

Rolling with the momentum from the previous week's upset, the 49ers took on the playoff-bound Buccaneers as their final home game of the season, and of perennial pro-bowler Bryant Young's career.

With the Buccaneers clinching their division in Week 15, and no improvement in their seed in sight, they treated it as a glorified exhibition game by resting the majority of their starters after the first few drives. Although it wasn't an important game in the standings for either team, the 49ers had their pride – and maybe their head coach Mike Nolan's job – on the line, and the Bucs wanted to make sure that their momentum and edge kept up as they entered the playoffs.

The game came down to a matter of inches, as the Buccaneers final touchdown with 80 seconds remaining led to a failed 2-point attempt at a tying score; receiver Michael Clayton caught the pass in the back of the end zone but half of his foot came down out of bounds.

Week 17: at Cleveland Browns

The 49ers finished the season with a loss, dropping to a final standings of 5–11.

The Browns became just the fifth team in history to miss the playoffs after coming away with 10 victories in the regular season.

The loss gave the 49ers the seventh pick in the 2008 NFL Draft, which they owed to the New England Patriots.

References

External links
 
 49ers Archive from Football for Breakfast

San Francisco
San Francisco 49ers seasons
San
2007 in San Francisco